Gnathophis codoniphorus is an eel in the family Congridae (conger/garden eels). It was described by Günther Maul in 1972. It is a marine, deep water-dwelling eel which is known from the Azorean slope at the Great Meteor Seamount, in the northeastern Atlantic Ocean.

References

codoniphorus
Taxa named by Günther Maul
Fish described in 1972